The Tour de Meria is a ruined Genoese tower in Corsica located in the commune of Meria on the east coast of Cap Corse.

The tower was one of a series of coastal defences constructed by the Republic of Genoa between 1530 and 1620 to stem the attacks by Barbary pirates.

References

Towers in Corsica